This was the first edition of the tournament.

Mattia Bellucci won the title after defeating Cem İlkel 1–6, 6–3, 7–5 in the final.

Seeds

Draw

Finals

Top half

Bottom half

References

External links
Main draw
Qualifying draw

Vilnius Open - 1
2022 Singles